Marsk Tower ("Marsh Tower" in English) is a double helix-shaped corten steel observation tower designed by the Bjarke Ingels Group located in Wadden Sea National Park, specifically at the Marsk Camp in the southern Denmark town of Skærbæk. it overlooks both the North Sea and the park itself. The tower, a double spiral staircase consisting of 272 steps (141 ascending and 131 descending), was commissioned by the town of Skærbæk in an effort to boost tourism to the area.

References

Towers in Denmark
Weathering steel
Buildings and structures in Tønder Municipality